Substance Abuse may mean:

 Substance abuse, such as drug abuse
 Substance Abuse (band), a hip-hop group
 Substance Abuse, a 2009 mixtape by Smoke DZA, re-issued in 2012
 "Substance Abuse", the 20th episode of the anime Eureka Seven